Darren Higgins (born 1965) is an Australian former professional rugby league footballer who played in the 1980s and 1990s.

Playing career
Higgins began his career at St. George Dragons, where he played three seasons between 1988 and 1990. He was a reserve for the Dragons in their 1988 Panasonic Cup victory. 

Higgins then moved to the Cronulla Sharks, and played five seasons for them between 1991 and 1995. He ended his Australian career with the Western Reds between 1996 and 1997, and finished his career at the London Broncos in 1998.

References

St. George Dragons players
Cronulla-Sutherland Sharks players
Western Reds players
London Broncos players
Australian rugby league players
1965 births
Living people
Rugby league centres
Rugby league wingers
Place of birth missing (living people)